This is a list of commemorative coins issued by the Central Bank of Russia in 2009:

References

2009
Commemorative coins